Neocorus zikani is a species of beetle in the family Cerambycidae. It was described by Melzer in 1920.

References

Neocorini
Beetles described in 1920